Cunera Monalua is a former Papua New Guinea international lawn bowler.

Bowls career
Monalua won a triples gold medal at the Asia Pacific Bowls Championships in Lae, Papua New Guinea.

She won a silver medal in the Women's fours at the 1994 Commonwealth Games in Victoria with Elizabeth Bure, Linda Ahmat and Wena Piande. 

Sixteen years later she competed in the pairs event at the 2010 Commonwealth Games. Monalua has also won a gold medal in the triples at the Asia Pacific Bowls Championships.

References

Living people
1953 births
Bowls players at the 1994 Commonwealth Games
Bowls players at the 2010 Commonwealth Games
Commonwealth Games silver medallists for Papua New Guinea
Commonwealth Games medallists in lawn bowls
Papua New Guinean female bowls players
Medallists at the 1994 Commonwealth Games